Sovah Health - Danville, previously known as Danville Regional Medical Center is a 250-bed hospital located in Danville, Virginia, US. It was formerly known as The Memorial Hospital and changed its name in 1993, before being purchased by Lifepoint Hospitals in July 2005.

The hospital is certified by the Joint Commission.

References

External links
 Danville Regional Medical Center

Hospitals in Virginia
Buildings and structures in Danville, Virginia